"Light in Your Eyes" is the second and final single from Sheryl Crow's first compilation album titled The Very Best of Sheryl Crow (2003). It was released as a single only in Europe and Canada, even though it was sent to radio stations in the US and charted on the US Billboard adult contemporary chart in 2005, reaching #36, and the Adult Top 40, where it peaked at #10. It was also successful on the Triple A Chart where it peaked at No 4. It actually reached the Top40-Charts.com Top 100 Airplay Chart peaking at #34 and the Top Hits Online Charts, not going further than #53. Crow acknowledges George Harrison as being an influence in this song (particularly "My Sweet Lord").

In 2013 the song was covered by German singer Tabea on her album "Memories".

Track listing
UK CD Single, cat. no. 9862700
 "Light in Your Eyes"
 "You're Not the One"
 "My Favorite Mistake" - Live from Abbey Road Studios

References

2003 songs
2004 singles
Sheryl Crow songs
Songs written by John Shanks
Songs written by Sheryl Crow
Polydor Records singles